In mathematics and computer science, an event structure represents a set of events, some of which can only be performed after another (there is a dependency between the events) and some of which might not be performed together (there is a conflict between the events).

Formal definition
An event structure  consists of
 a set  of events
 a partial order relation on  called causal dependency,
 an irreflexive symmetric relation  called incompatibility (or conflict)
such that
 hereditary conflict: for every events , if  and  then .

See also
 Binary relation
 Mathematical structure

References
 

Computing terminology